Alfred Edwin Morris  (8 May 1894 – 19 October 1971) was the Bishop of Monmouth and Archbishop of Wales in the middle of the 20th century. After World War I service with the RAMC he was educated at St David's College Lampeter and then St John's College, Oxford. Ordained in 1924 he became Professor of Hebrew and Theology at St David's College, Lampeter, holding the post until his elevation to the episcopate. A noted author and Sub-Prelate of the Order of St John of Jerusalem, he retired in 1967 and died four years later. His papers are held at the Roderic Bowen Library.

A staunch defender of the Church in Wales, Morris attracted controversy when he said that "The Church in Wales is the Catholic Church in this land" and referred to Roman Catholic and Nonconformist clergy as being "strictly speaking, intruders" whose rights to function in Wales could not be acknowledged. He also campaigned against the retention of the word "Protestant" in the Coronation Oath, entering into detailed correspondence with the then Archbishop of Canterbury, Geoffrey Fisher, on the issue. He was unsuccessful, and Fisher even questioned whether such matters were really the business of a prelate who was "not a bishop of the Church of England".  Nonetheless, Fisher (who had by then retired) and Morris were later among those senior clergy who objected to the proposed Anglican-Methodist reunion which was being mooted during the late 1960s and early 1970s. They remained on friendly terms, with Fisher even saying that the new flurries of correspondence between them was "quite like old times". For all his claims of a Tractarian position however, Morris did not, it appears, always endear himself to those clergy who took a more Anglo-Catholic stance. He prohibited extra-eucharistic devotions to the Sacrament (such as Benediction) in his diocese and insisted that permission be sought before the Sacrament was reserved in a tabernacle or aumbry for use in giving Holy Communion to the sick. Although the basis for his faith and doctrine was undoubtedly the 1662 Book of Common Prayer, he oversaw as Archbishop of Wales the preparation of a new Order for the Celebration of the Holy Eucharist for use in the Church in Wales. When, in 1966 this replaced the 1662 rite he commended it unreservedly, saying that the new rite brought "priest and people more effectively than does the Prayer Book service". The John Piper east window and mural at St Woolos' (Gwynllyw) Cathedral in Newport, Wales, were commissioned and installed during his episcopate.

Works 

 The problem of life and death (1950)
 The Christian use of alcoholic beverages (1960)
 The Lambeth Quadrilateral and reunion (1969)

References

1894 births
1971 deaths
People from Ceredigion
Alumni of St John's College, Oxford
British Army personnel of World War I
Academics of the University of Wales, Lampeter
Bishops of Monmouth
Archbishops of Wales
20th-century bishops of the Church in Wales
20th-century Anglican archbishops
Sub-Prelates of the Venerable Order of Saint John
Royal Army Medical Corps officers
20th-century Anglican theologians
19th-century Anglican theologians